The St. Paul Saints are a Minor League Baseball team of the International League and the Triple-A affiliate of the Minnesota Twins. They are located in Saint Paul, Minnesota, and have played their home games at CHS Field since 2015. They previously played at Midway Stadium from 1993 to 2014.

From their founding in 1993 through 2020, the Saints were an independent baseball team with no affiliation with Major League Baseball (MLB). They played in the Northern League from 1993 to 2005 and the American Association of Independent Professional Baseball from 2006 to 2020. The Saints became an MLB-affiliated team in conjunction with the reorganization of the minor leagues beginning with the 2021 season. They were placed in the Triple-A East, but this was renamed the International League in 2022.

Before the arrival of the Minnesota Twins in 1961, there was a long history of minor league baseball teams called the St. Paul Saints, as well as their crosstown rivals the Minneapolis Millers. One incarnation of the Saints participated in the Union Association, a short-lived major league, in 1884. A second incarnation was active in the Western League from 1894 to 1899, and became a forerunner of the modern Chicago White Sox. The third and most long-lived incarnation of the Saints was active in the American Association from 1915 to 1960.

History

St. Paul Saints (1894–1899)

As described in Lee Allen's book, The American League Story (Putnam, 1962), the team began as the Sioux City Cornhuskers franchise in a minor league called the Western League. This circuit had reorganized itself in November 1893, with Ban Johnson as president. Johnson, a Cincinnati-based reporter, had been recommended by his friend Charles Comiskey, former major league star with the St. Louis Browns in the 1880s, who was then managing the Cincinnati Reds. After the 1894 season, when Comiskey's contract with the Reds was up, he decided to take his chances at ownership. He bought the Sioux City team and transferred it to St. Paul, where it enjoyed some success over the next five seasons.

In 1900, the Western League changed its name to the American League. It was still officially a minor league, a part of the National Agreement and an underling of the National League. The National League gave permission to the American League to put a team in Chicago, and on March 21, 1900, Comiskey moved his St. Paul club to the South Side, where they became the Chicago White Sox.

St. Paul Saints (1901–1960)

Another team called the Saints played Minor League Baseball in the American Association from 1901 to 1960. The Saints finished first in the American Association nine times, and won the Little World Series in 1924. During this period, the Saints were a farm club of the Chicago White Sox (1936–1942), the Brooklyn Dodgers (1944–1957), and the Los Angeles Dodgers (1958–1960). The Saints played streetcar home and away double headers with their local rivals, the Minneapolis Millers. When the Minnesota Twins came to town in 1961, the Saints became the Omaha Dodgers while the Millers ceased operations and their role as affiliate to the Boston Red Sox was filled by the Seattle Rainiers. Lexington Park served as the Saints' home stadium for most of those years.

During the six decades of the original American Association minor league, the Minneapolis Millers and St. Paul Saints engaged in vigorous rivalry known as the Streetcar Series. This series has been documented in a book by Rex Hamann entitled The Millers and the Saints, Baseball Championships of the Twin Cities Rivals (2014).

Current franchise

Independent baseball (1993–2020)

The current inception of the St. Paul Saints was formed in 1993 in the Northern League, one of several independent leagues not affiliated with Major League Baseball. The Saints are known for promotions that are sometimes over-the-top even by the standards of Minor League Baseball. In this regard, Mike Veeck, formerly the team's principal owner and still owner of a large interest in the team, is seen as following in the footsteps of his father Bill Veeck, who was famous for conceiving outlandish promotions as an owner of the major league St. Louis Browns, Cleveland Indians, and Chicago White Sox. The current majority owner, Marvin Goldklang, also owns a stake in four other Minor League Baseball teams: the Fort Myers Miracle, Sioux Falls Pheasants, Hudson Valley Renegades, and Charleston RiverDogs. Comedian and actor Bill Murray is also a part owner.

Despite the considerable naysaying at their inception, the Saints became one of the most successful teams in the Northern League and all of independent baseball. From 2002 to 2004, the Saints saw severely reduced attendance, owing partially to renewed interest in the Minnesota Twins of Major League Baseball, who won the 2002, 2003, and 2004 American League Central Division championships.

The Saints have figured prominently in the creation of modern independent baseball. The team has been featured in books (Rebel Baseball by Steve Perlstein, 1993; Slouching Toward Fargo by Neal Karlen, 1998) and a cable network series (Baseball, Minnesota, FX Network, 1996–97). Mike Veeck wrote a book that covered the mantra "Fun is Good" (2005) and describes the business approach he has used for many years. The team's history is also featured in the documentary film For The Fun Of The Game, which was released in 2018.

On May 31, 1997, the Saints became the first professional men's baseball team since integration to have a female on their roster. Ila Borders, a pitcher, played with the team out of the bullpen for a month before being traded.

On September 29, 2005, the Saints left the Northern League, along with the Lincoln Saltdogs, Sioux City Explorers, and the Sioux Falls Pheasants to start the American Association for the 2006 season.

In June 2009, the Saints began a push to build a new stadium in Downtown Saint Paul. The proposed 7,500-seat stadium would be located in the Lowertown neighborhood near a planned maintenance facility for the METRO Green Line light rail. The city of Saint Paul requested $25 million in its 2010 bonding wish list to the Minnesota Legislature.

During their final 5 years in the American Association and their first 5 years in CHS Field, the Saints consistently led the league in attendance averaging more than 8,000 fans in the regular season from 2015-19.

In 2020, the Saints competed as one of six teams in a condensed 60-game season as a result of the COVID-19 pandemic. They played much of their season away from their home stadium, CHS Field, instead being based at Sioux Falls Stadium, sharing a home field with the Sioux Falls Canaries. On August 4, 2020, however, the Saints returned to play at CHS Field.

The beginnings of a closer relationship with the local Major League Baseball franchise, the Minnesota Twins, came in the summer of 2020. Due to the pandemic, the 2020 MLB season was modified in several ways, including the cancellation of the 2020 Minor League Baseball season. Because of this, teams were allowed to use taxi squads located at nearby facilities where non-active minor league players were allowed to train. The Twins made use of the Saints' CHS Field facilities as home for their taxi squad.

Notable players to have played for the Saints during their independent baseball years include Shane Costa, Glenn Davis, J. D. Drew, Leon "Bull" Durham, Gavin Fingleson, Dan Johnson, Brandon Kintzler, Kevin Millar, Minnie Miñoso, Jack Morris, Darryl Motley, Matt Nokes, Rey Ordóñez, Tanner Scheppers, Dave Stevens, Darryl Strawberry and Caleb Thielbar.

Affiliated baseball (2021–present)

Due to the 2021 full-scale reorganization of Minor League Baseball, there was much speculation as to what would happen to independent leagues such as the American Association and specifically the Saints. On November 11, 2020, it was reported that the Minnesota Twins ended their 18-year affiliation with their Triple-A affiliate, the Rochester Red Wings. At this time it was also reported that the Saints were a front-runner to be the Twins' new Triple-A affiliate. The main barrier to a deal was said to be the $20 million fee required for affiliation. The Twins aided in this by becoming minority shareholders in the Saints and placing their Triple-A affiliation in St. Paul beginning with the 2021 season. The Saints were organized into the Triple-A East. At a distance of 12.9 miles (along Interstate 94, including surface streets), CHS Field is the closest Triple-A ballpark to its MLB parent team.

The Saints began competition as a Twins affiliate on May 4, 2021, with an 8–2 loss to the Omaha Storm Chasers at Werner Park in Papillion, Nebraska. St. Paul ended the season in third place in the Midwestern Division with a 61–59 record. No playoffs were held to determine a league champion; instead, the team with the best regular-season record was declared the winner. However, 10 games that had been postponed from the start of the season were reinserted into the schedule as a postseason tournament called the Triple-A Final Stretch in which all 30 Triple-A clubs competed for the highest winning percentage. St. Paul finished the tournament tied for seventh place with a 6–4 record. In 2022, the Triple-A East became known as the International League, the name historically used by the regional circuit prior to the 2021 reorganization.

Roster

Notable promotions
In an attempt to gain publicity in a metropolitan area that hosts five major pro sports teams and a major college program, the Saints create unique promotions that have received media attention numerous times.
The Saints celebrated the 40th anniversary of Animal House on August 14, 2018, by staging the world's largest food fight after the completion of the fifth inning against the Sioux Falls Canaries. Approximately 8,000 fans participated.
On August 22, 2017, the Saints held the world's largest Twister game, with over 56,000 dots painted on the outfield grass.
On July 21, 2015, in an event sponsored by My Pillow, the world's largest pillow fight was held after the second inning, with 6,261 participants. The event was hosted by Stephen Baldwin. Additionally, in honor of the 40th season of Saturday Night Live, former cast member Joe Piscopo performed the national anthem in his impression of Frank Sinatra, and made other appearances throughout the game.
 A May 11, 2013, exhibition game between the Saints and Gary SouthShore Railcats was played without umpires. The team instead had a judge, in a judicial robe, call balls and strikes from behind the pitcher. Calls at first and third bases were made by a "jury" of 12 Little League players, with the judge able to overrule any calls.
In August 2012, as part of a regional conference held by the Minnesota Atheists, the Saints held "A Night of Unbelievable Fun", where the team wore alternate jerseys branding themselves as the "Mr. Paul Aint's". The promotion was reprised in subsequent seasons.
 On July 23, 2011, the Saints celebrated National Hot Dog Day and parodied Anthony Weiner and his first sexting scandal. The first 1,501 fans age 18 or older received "Tweeting Wiener Boxer Shorts", depicting a blue bird taking a picture of a hot dog, or "wiener". The bird was deliberately drawn to resemble the logo of Twitter, the social media site that Weiner used to send links to indecent photos.
The Saints announced a giveaway for their May 23, 2009, game against the Sioux Falls Pheasants of 2,500 bobblehead dolls dressed as the Sesame Street character Count von Count, supposedly celebrating the 40th anniversary of the series. The Saints' version of this doll, however, had the face of Al Franken on one side and Norm Coleman on the other and was named "Count von Re-Count"—referring to the prolonged recount in the 2008 U.S. Senate election between the two men. The Saints made further jabs at the race:
 The ceremonial first pitch was thrown by Dean Barkley, who ran in that election as a third-party candidate.
 Fans were asked during the game to spin the heads of their dolls to either Coleman or Franken. Attorneys were present to count the "votes" from this process, poking fun at the extensive involvement of attorneys in the recount process. The team's website stated that fans could challenge the "results" at the team's Fan Services booth during the game.
 The team also facetiously stated on its site that it would not make the results of that night's game official until mid-June—around the time that the entire Minnesota Supreme Court was scheduled to rule on Coleman's appeal of a panel ruling that Franken had won. (The Court issued its ruling in Franken's favor on June 30, with Coleman then conceding.)
In May 2008, the Saints announced the giveaway of 2,500 bobble foot dolls, ostensibly to celebrate National Tap Dance Day. The dolls, which featured two feet visible beneath the door of a bathroom stall, have been covered in the national news for their reference to Senator Larry Craig, notorious for soliciting sex in a Minneapolis–Saint Paul Airport restroom in August 2007.
In August  2007, the Saints announced that rubber dog toys would be given out as a jab to the federal dogfighting case involving Atlanta Falcons quarterback Michael Vick.
In April 2006, the Saints announced that rubber boats would be given out during a May 27, 2006, game, to honor the 30th anniversary of the television show The Love Boat. However, details of the promotion indicate that it was intended as a jab at the 2005 boat scandal involving the Minnesota Vikings, where several members of the team were allegedly involved in illicit behavior on a private cruise. The promotional rubber boats used the same color as the Vikings uniforms (purple and yellow) and were named Minnetonka Queen (a reference to Lake Minnetonka, where the cruise took place).
On May 8, 2005, the Saints hosted a Mother's Day exhibition game against the Sioux Falls Canaries which began at 5:35 a.m. and set an unofficial record for earliest game time in baseball history. 2,253 fans attended the 6-6 tie, with about 500 of them tailgating overnight in the parking lot. Free cereal was given away and all ticket sales went to charity.
In August 2004, the Saints held a Bobblehead Election to tap into the campaign buzz around the election year. Fans were told to select either a John Kerry or George Bush bobblehead as their "vote." The stunt was capped off with a speech by the winning bobblehead. A real donkey and a donkey dressed like an elephant (the Saints were unable to obtain a real elephant) added to the atmosphere.
In August 2003, the Saints held "Randy Moss Hood Ornament Night", poking fun at Randy Moss, then a wide receiver for the Vikings. Earlier that year, Moss was involved in an incident where he bumped a traffic control officer with his car while he attempted to make a turn.
During the 2002 Major League Baseball labor negotiations, the Saints gave away seat cushions with pictures of commissioner Bud Selig on one side and player's association Executive Director Donald Fehr on the other.
In 2002, in response to Selig's controversial decision to end the MLB All-Star Game in a 7–7 tie, the Saints gave out neckties (or "ties") with Bud Selig's image.

Season-by-season records

References
Specific

General
 aabfan.com – yearly league standings & awards (American Association)
 nlfan.com – yearly league standings & awards (Northern League)

External links 
 Official website
 nlfan.com Saints Guide (Northern League 1993–2005)
 aabfan.com Saints Guide (American Association 2006–present)

Former American Association of Professional Baseball teams
International League teams
Minnesota Twins minor league affiliates
Northern League (baseball, 1993–2010) teams
Professional baseball teams in Minnesota
Sports in Saint Paul, Minnesota
Triple-A East teams